Minuscule 112 (in the Gregory-Aland numbering), ε 146 (Soden), is a Greek minuscule manuscript of the New Testament, on parchment leaves. Palaeographically it has been assigned to the 11th century. The manuscript has complex contents ad full marginalia.

Description 

The codex contains the text of the four Gospels on 167 parchment leaves. The text is written in one column per page, 33 lines per page. The large initial letters in gold.

There is also another division according to the smaller Ammonian Sections, with references to the Eusebian Canons (in Matthew 1-Mark 2 in the same line).

According to Scrivener it is "a very beautiful copy".

Text 

The Greek text of the codex is a representative of the Byzantine text-type. Aland placed it in Category V.

According to the Claremont Profile Method in represents Kx in Luke 1 and Luke 20; in Luke 10 no profile was made. It creates textual cluster 112.

History 

The manuscript was examined by Scholz, who collated it partially. C. R. Gregory saw it in 1883.

It is housed at the Bodleian Library (E. D. Clarke 10) at Oxford.

See also 

 List of New Testament minuscules
 Biblical manuscript
 Textual criticism

Notes

References

Further reading 

 

Greek New Testament minuscules
11th-century biblical manuscripts
Bodleian Library collection